Entometa is a genus of moths in the family Lasiocampidae. The genus was erected by Francis Walker in 1855. All species are from Australia.

Species
Based on Lepidoptera and Some Other Life Forms:
Entometa fervens (Walker, 1855)
Entometa guttularis (Walker, 1855)
Entometa decorata (Walker, 1865)
Entometa apicalis (Walker, 1855)
Entometa guerinii (Le Guillou, 1841)
Entometa chlorosacca Turner, 1924

External links

Lasiocampidae